= Meridian highway =

Proposed road in Russia

The Meridian highway is the final missing part for completion of the trans Eurasia highway. Meridian road would be constructed in Russia ultimately connecting China and Europe for cargo delivery by truck leveraging the fact that the respective road networks in China, Kazakhstan, Belorussia are already constructed. Russian Prime Minister Dmitry Medvedev has approved the construction of a new tolled motorway across Russia designed to significantly shorten cargo routes.

Total length of the Meridian road is 2 000 km while the total distance to deliver cargo by truck, for example, from Shanghai to Hamburg equals to 11 000 km. That is times shorter the delivery via Suez channel by ocean.

Cargo delivery by truck would be 4 times faster and more reliable rather than delivery by ocean. Delivery time expected to be 11 days by the new highway as opposed to 30–50 days by the sea.

== History of the project ==
Idea of the project came to Roman Nesterenko who suggested to implement the project to his partner Alexander Ryazanov known as a former deputy chairman of Gazprom. Russian investment holding LLC Meridian, co-owned by businessmen Alexander Ryazanov and Roman Nesterenko, is implementing the project.

Project was approved by the Prime minister of the Russian Federation in 2019.

At the end of 2021 the Prime minister of the Russian Federation announced that implementation of this project will be in the long-term interests of all Shanghai Cooperation Organization countries and will help strengthen transport, logistics and cooperation ties. In light of environmental challenges, we will stipulate the broad use of natural-gas-based vehicles on the Meridian route
